Taylor Ferry is an unincorporated community in Wagoner County, Oklahoma, United States, situated on Fort Gibson Lake. The community was the site of a ferry crossing across the Grand River when Oklahoma was the Indian Territory during the 19th century.

References

Unincorporated communities in Oklahoma
Unincorporated communities in Wagoner County, Oklahoma